Sir Erasmus Philipps, 3rd Baronet (c 1623 – 18 January 1697) was a Welsh politician who sat in the House of Commons  in 1654 and 1659.

Philipps was the eldest son of Sir Richard Philipps, 2nd Baronet of Picton Castle. He succeeded to the baronetcy before 1654. 

In 1654, Philipps was elected Member of Parliament for Pembrokeshire in the First Protectorate Parliament. He was appointed a Militia Commissioner for south Wales on 14 March 1654. In 1655 he was appointed J.P. for Pembrokeshire and became a commissioner for Pembrokeshire, Cardiganshire and Carmarthenshire on 10 August 1655. He was elected MP for Pembrokeshire again in 1659 for the Third Protectorate Parliament. 
 
Philipps married firstly Lady Cecily Finch, daughter of Thomas Finch, 11th Earl of Winchilsea, and secondly Catherine Darcy, daughter of Edward Darcy. He was succeeded by his son John, who was also a Member of Parliament.

References

 

1620s births
1697 deaths
Members of the Parliament of England (pre-1707) for constituencies in Wales
Baronets in the Baronetage of England
People from Pembrokeshire
Year of birth uncertain
English MPs 1654–1655
English MPs 1659